Shannon Eagland (born 16 May 1990) is an Australian netball player in the Suncorp Super Netball league, playing for the West Coast Fever.

In her early career, Eagland was selected in the Australia U/21 Team and Participated in the 2009 Australian World Youth Cup championships as part or the winning Australian team.
She began her ANZ Championship netball career in the ANZ Championship in 2011 for the Melbourne Vixens as a temporary replacement player. In 2012 Eagland joined the Queensland Firebirds where she played 11 games before moving to the Melbourne Vixens, where she played 13 games in 2013. In 2014 she left the ANZ Championship and played for the Melbourne University Lightning in the Victorian Netball League, earning a place in the VNL Championship Team of the Year. Upon moving to the Fever in the new Super Netball league, Eagland ruptured her anterior cruciate ligament in the fourth round and missed the remainder of the season. She returned to the court in the 2018 pre-season.

References

External links
 West Coast Fever profile
 Suncorp Super Netball profile
 Netball Draft Central profile

1990 births
Living people
Australian netball players
Adelaide Thunderbirds players
Melbourne Vixens players
West Coast Fever players
Queensland Firebirds players
Victorian Netball League players
Victorian Fury players
Australian Netball League players
Suncorp Super Netball players
Netball players from South Australia
Australian Institute of Sport netball players